A national development bank is a development bank created by a country's government that provides financing for the purposes of economic development of the country.

List of development banks

Americas
 Business Development Bank of Canada
 Brazilian Development Bank (BNDES)
 Banco de Desarrollo de El Salvador (BANDESAL), El Salvador
 Corporación Financiera de Desarrollo (Cofide), Peru
 Financiera de Desarrollo Territorial (FINDETER), Colombia
 Puerto Rico Government Development Bank
 Development Bank of Jamaica, Jamaica
Reconstruction Finance Corporation

Europe
 Development Bank of Austria
 British Business Bank
 Bank Gospodarstwa Krajowego (BGK) of Poland
 Black Sea Trade and Development Bank
 Banque publique d'investissement, Bpifrance
 Bulgarian Development Bank
 Caisse des Dépôts et Consignations
 Cassa Depositi e Prestiti
 Croatian Bank for Reconstruction and Development
 Eurasian Development Bank
European Investment Bank
 Hellenic Industrial Development Bank
 Hungarian development bank
 Instituto de Crédito Oficial
 Institute for the Works of Religion
 Industrial Development Bank of Turkey
 KfW
 Norwegian Industrial and Regional Development Fund
 Scottish National Investment Bank
 Slovenská záručná a rozvojová banka - Slovak Guarantee and Development Bank
 Strategic Banking Corporation of Ireland
 Development Bank of Turkey
 Vnesheconombank
 Investment Fund for Developing Countries

Asia
 Agricultural Development Bank of China
 Asian Infrastructure Investment Bank, Beijing, China
 Bahrain Development Bank
 China Development Bank
 Development Bank of Japan
 Development Bank of Kazakhstan
 Development Bank of Sarawak
 Development Bank of Singapore
 Development Bank of the Philippines
 Bangladesh Development Bank
 Fiji Development Bank
 Industrial Bank of Kuwait
 Industrial Development Bank of India
 Industrial Finance Corporation of India
 Japan Bank for International Cooperation
 Korea Development Bank
 National Development Bank of Sri Lanka
 Industrial Development Bank of Pakistan
 Qatar Development Bank
 Small Industries Development Bank of India
 National Development Bank of Papua New Guinea
 National Bank for Agriculture and Rural Development, India

Africa
 African Development Bank
 Agricultural Development Bank of Ghana
 East African Development Bank
 The Bank of Industry (BOI)
 Development Bank of Kenya
 Development Bank of Nigeria
 Development Bank of Southern Africa
 National Investment Bank Ghana
 National Development Bank Botswana
 Rwanda Development Bank
 Uganda Development Bank
 Banco Nacional de Investimento, Mozambique
 Tanzania Agricultural Development Bank, Tanzania

References

Economic development
Investment banking